Canadian Helicopters Limited, formerly a part of the Canadian operations of CHC Helicopter Corporation, operates 112 aircraft from 26 bases across Canada and provides a broad range of helicopter services to support the following activities: emergency medical evacuation; infrastructure maintenance; utilities; oil and gas; forestry; mining; construction; and air transportation. Canadian Helicopters Limited also operates an advanced flight school; provides third party repair and maintenance services; and provides helicopter services in the United States in support of specialty operations including forest fire suppression activities and geophysical exploration programs.

History

Commercial helicopter flying began in British Columbia in the summer of 1947. Three former Royal Canadian Air Force officers, pilots Carl Agar and Barney Bent, and engineer Alf Stringer, were operating a fixed-wing charter company, Okanagan Air Services Ltd., out of Penticton. In July 1947 they raised enough money to purchase a Bell 47-B3 and pay for their flying and maintenance training.

Okanagan Air Services moved to Vancouver in 1949, was renamed Okanagan Helicopters Ltd. and, by 1954, had become the largest commercial helicopter operator in the world.

Toronto Helicopters was founded by Len Routledge and Douglas Dunlop. It was a pioneer in air ambulance services in Ontario and operated helicopters for the Ontario Ministry of Health.

Sealand Helicopters was founded by Newfoundland businessman Craig Dobbin in February 1977.

In 1987, Dobbin headed a group that purchased Okanagan Helicopters and Toronto Helicopters and merged them with his own company, Sealand Helicopters to form Canadian Helicopters.

Until November 2000, Canadian Helicopters was the domestic operating arm of Canadian Helicopters International, a wholly owned subsidiary of CHC Helicopter Corporation. In 2000, Canadian Helicopters was divested by way of a management buy-out.  The company continued operations as Canadian Helicopters until it was renamed HNZ Group Inc. after acquiring that company.  In December 2017, the company was taken private as Canadian Helicopters Limited.

As of September 2019, Canadian Helicopters Limited has two air operator's certificates. The first, 18373, is Canadian Helicopters Limited - Hélicoptères Canadiens Limitée trading as Canadian Helicopters Offshore in Enfield, Nova Scotia with two helicopters in Goffs (Halifax Stanfield International Airport). The second, 11988, is used for the rest of the fleet in Les Cèdres, Quebec.

Bases
The following are bases in Canada:

 Alberta - Western Head Office Edmonton International Airport, Fort McMurray International Airport, Grande Prairie Airport
 British Columbia - Fort Nelson Airport, Fort St. John Airport, Penticton Regional Airport (flight school), Smithers Airport, Northwest Regional Airport Terrace-Kitimat
 Manitoba - Portage la Prairie/Southport Airport (DND Training & Maintenance Support, Allied Wings)
 New Brunswick - Fredericton International Airport
 Newfoundland and Labrador - Bishop's Falls, Goose Bay Airport, Pasadena
 Northwest Territories - Inuvik (Mike Zubko) Airport, Norman Wells Airport, Yellowknife Airport
 Nova Scotia - Halifax Stanfield International Airport (Halifax EMS and offshore)
 Nunavut - Cambridge Bay Airport, Hall Beach Airport, Iqaluit Airport
 Quebec - Corporate Head Office: Montreal, (Les Cèdres), Chevery Airport, La Grande Rivière Airport (Radisson, Whapchiwem), Sept-Îles Airport
 Yukon - Erik Nielsen Whitehorse International Airport

Heliports
Canadian Helicopters Limited operates the following heliports:
Chibougamau Heliport, Chibougamau, Quebec
Montréal/Les Cèdres Heliport, Montreal, Quebec
Sagard Heliport, Sagard, Quebec
Smithers (Canadian) Heliport, Smithers, British Columbia

Fleet
As of September 2019, Canadian Helicopters Limited has the following aircraft registered with Transport Canada:

The aircraft are listed by Transport Canada as being registered to Canadian Helicopters Limited - Hélicoptères Canadiens Limitée registered in Quebec.

The Transport Canada list also shows an Aerospatiale AS350D, an Aerospatiale AS 355F1, a Bell 212, a Bell 206B, a Robinson R22 BETA, and two Sikorsky S-76A all with cancelled certificates.

References

External links

 Official site

Regional airlines of Quebec
Helicopter airlines
Airlines established in 1987
Companies based in St. John's, Newfoundland and Labrador